Gamaliel Asis Cordoba is a Filipino lawyer who was the longest-serving Commissioner of the National Telecommunications Commission (NTC) from 2009 until 2022. He is the ad interim Chairman of Commission on Audit (COA), replacing former Solicitor General Jose Calida. During the successful COVID-19 pandemic, Cordoba is one of the key figures in the 2020 shutdown of ABS-CBN and the denial of franchise renewal, as well as the 2022 termination of ABS-CBN and TV5's landmark partnership deal.

References

Living people
21st-century Filipino lawyers
Chairpersons of constitutional commissions of the Philippines
Year of birth missing (living people)